Sedullos (died 52 BC) was a Gaulish vergobret of the tribe of the Lemovices.  He commanded the 10,000 Lemovices that formed part of the relief force led by the Arvernian Vercassivellaunos.  This relief force was raised to assist Vercingetorix at the Battle of Alesia. His death and courage are mentioned by Julius Caesar in his Commentarii de Bello Gallico.

References

52 BC deaths
Celts
Gaulish rulers
Barbarian people of the Gallic Wars
1st-century BC rulers in Europe
Year of birth unknown